Agniya Lvovna Barto (– 1 April 1981) was a Soviet poet and children's writer of Russian Jewish origin.

Biography
Agniya was born Gitel Leybovna Volova in Moscow to a Russian Jewish family. Her father, Lev Nikolayevich Volov, was a veterinarian, and her mother, Maria (née Blokh), was from Kaunas, Lithuania. Agniya studied at a ballet school. She liked poetry and soon started to write her own, trying to imitate Anna Akhmatova and Vladimir Mayakovsky. She read her poetry at the graduation ceremony from the ballet school. Among the guests was the Minister of Education Anatoly Lunacharsky who remarked that instead of becoming a ballerina she should be a professional poet. According to legend, despite the fact that all of Barto's poetry at that time was about love and revolution, Lunacharsky predicted that she would become a famous children's poet.

Agniya married ornithologist and poet Pavel Barto, grandson of an English-born merchant Richard Barto. Some of her children's poems were published under two names: Agniya Barto and Pavel Barto. In 1925 she published her first books: Chinese boy Wang-Li (Китайчонок Ван-Ли) and Mishka the Petty Thief (Мишка-Воришка). Subsequently, she published The First of May (Первое мая), 1926 and Brothers (Братишки), 1928 which received a positive review from Korney Chukovsky. After publishing a book of poetic miniatures for toddlers entitled Toys (Игрушки) in 1936, she suddenly became one of the most popular children's authors, with millions of published copies.

During World War II, she wrote patriotic anti-Nazi poetry, often directly addressed to the leader of the Soviet people, Joseph Stalin. She also worked as a Western Front correspondent for the newspaper Komsomolskaya Pravda. In 1949, she was awarded the Stalin Prize for her book Poetry for Children.

During the 1960s, Barto worked in an orphanage that inspired her to write the poem Zvenigorod (Звенигород, written in 1947, first published in 1966). For nine years, Barto was the anchor of the radio program Find a Person (Найти человека), which helped people find family members lost during World War II. During that time she helped to reunite no fewer than a thousand families. She wrote a book about it in 1966. In 1977, she published Translations from the Children's Language (Переводы с детского) composed of her translations of poetry written by children of different countries. She died in Moscow in 1981.

Script author
She was the author of the script for the children's films Foundling (Подкидыш, 1940), An Elephant and a Rope (Слон и верёвочка) 1945, Alyosha Ptitsyn builds his character (Алёша Птицын вырабатывает характер), 1953, 10,000 Boys (10 000 мальчиков), 1962, Find a Person (Найти человека), 1973.

Awards and other recognition
Order of Lenin
Order of the October Revolution
Two Orders of the Red Banner of Labour
Order of the Badge of Honour
Medal "For the Salvation of the Drowning"
Order of the Smile (Poland)
1950: Stalin Prize
1972: Lenin Prize 
1976: Hans Christian Andersen Award. 
Barto crater on Venus was named after her in 1985. 
A minor planet 2279 Barto discovered in 1968 by Soviet astronomer Lyudmila Chernykh was also named in her honor.

References

External links
  AgniyaBarto.Ru - «Agniya Barto. Poetry for Children» - Last and best collection of verses for children under edition of the author. Humour and satire in Agniya Barto creativity.
Agniya Barto poetry at Stihipoeta.ru
 Agniya Barto. Poems
Biography

Illustrations to Barto's book Grievance by Marina Uspenskaya

1901 births
1981 deaths
Writers from Moscow
People from Moskovsky Uyezd
Russian Jews
Soviet Jews
Russian children's writers
Russian women poets
Soviet women poets
Soviet poets
Soviet children's writers
Children's poets
Russian women children's writers
20th-century Russian women writers
Stalin Prize winners
Lenin Prize winners
Recipients of the Order of Lenin
Recipients of the Order of the Red Banner of Labour
Burials at Novodevichy Cemetery
Soviet journalists